Table tennis has been held at the Pan American Games since the 1979 Pan American Games in San Juan, Puerto Rico.

Events

Medal winners

Medal table

References

 
Table tennis
Pan American Games
Pan American Games
Pan American Games